Microbrand watches are wristwatches produced by independent watch companies that have an output of about 300–2000 watches per year.

History 
The term "microbrand" is usually synonymous with the microbrand watch industry, though it can also be more widely used to describe any small-scale brand that is likely only recognized in niche communities and among hobbyists.

The first microbrands debuted in the early to mid-2000s. With the advent of the Internet, brands were able to distribute watches directly to consumers within e-commerce, without taking on the overhead usually associated with luxury goods such as retail locations, marketing budgets, and other associated costs. 

As a result, the prices of microbrand watches are generally significantly lower than luxury-tier watches, despite being produced in the same factories. Many brands that started (or were revived) during this period are now called "legacy microbrands" within the watch enthusiast community.

Recently, there has a large uptick in the rise of microbrand watches and microbrands in general.

See also

 List of watch manufacturers
 Microbrewery
 Microdistillery

References

Time measurement systems
Horology
Watch brands
Watch manufacturing companies
Watches